Dendrotriton or bromeliad salamanders is a genus of salamanders in the family Plethodontidae, endemic to South and Central America: from Southwestern Chiapas, Mexico, to Honduras. These are lungless species possessing a slender body, long tail and prominent eyes. They inhabit high-elevation forests with high humidity.

Species
This genus includes the following eight species:

Notes

External links
Dendrotriton at Mexico Herpetology
Dendrotriton at Discover Life

 
Amphibians of Central America
Amphibians of North America
Amphibian genera
Taxa named by David B. Wake
Taxonomy articles created by Polbot